Christopher Henry is a Barbadian Olympic boxer. He represented his country in the light-welterweight division at the 1992 Summer Olympics. He won his first bout against Dong Seidu of Ghana, and then lost his second bout to Laid Bouneb of Algeria.

References

1973 births
Living people
Barbadian male boxers
Olympic boxers of Barbados
Boxers at the 1992 Summer Olympics
Competitors at the 1993 Central American and Caribbean Games
Central American and Caribbean Games bronze medalists for Barbados
Commonwealth Games competitors for Barbados
Boxers at the 1994 Commonwealth Games
Light-welterweight boxers
Central American and Caribbean Games medalists in boxing